Indonesia XI (also known as Indonesia Selection, Indonesia Dream Team, or Liga (League) Selection) is a football team which represents the Indonesia League in matches. Indonesia XI mainly play non-FIFA 'A' international match mostly against clubs while the competitive matches such as World Cup and the Asian Cup qualifiers are played by the Indonesia national football team. Sometimes, the national team played in matches against clubs, like indicated below.

History 
The team consists of players from the top teams of the Indonesian league. Some of the players are also play for the Indonesia national team. Indonesia XI usually plays against associated football clubs throughout the world, mostly from Europe.

Matches 
Here are recent matches

 1 Non FIFA 'A' international match

Achievement
Aga Khan Gold Cup (Unofficial Asian Champions' Cup)
Winners (1): 1961

See also

 Indonesia national under-23 football team
 Indonesia national under-21 football team
 Indonesia national under-19 football team
 Indonesia national under-17 football team
 Indonesia women's national football team
 Indonesia national futsal team
 Indonesia national football team records and statistics

References

https://web.archive.org/web/20120225170142/
 http://id.olahraga.yahoo.com/news/timnas-vs-inter-milan-dikabarkan-berlaga-di-gbk-120427515--soccer.html
http://www.bolanews.com/read/sepakbola/indonesia/44702-24-Pemain-Disiapkan-Kontra-Arsenal.html

Liga Indonesia
Representative teams of association football leagues